Culver Ridge, or Normanook is a peak of the Kittatinny Mountains in Sussex County, New Jersey, United States. It lies along the Appalachian Trail in Stokes State Forest, overlooking Culver's Lake to the south, and Culvers Gap, a wind gap, to the southwest.

References

External links
Stokes State Forest

Mountains of New Jersey
Kittatinny Mountains
Mountains of Sussex County, New Jersey
Valleys of New Jersey
Wind gaps of the United States